Boletellus belizensis is a species of bolete fungus in the family Boletaceae. Found in Belize, it was described  as new to science in 2007.

References

External links

belizensis
Fungi described in 2007
Fungi of Central America